Nagarasampettai is a village in the Kumbakonam taluk of Thanjavur district, Tamil Nadu, India.

Demographics 

As per the 2001 census, Nagarasampettai had a total population of 2200 with 1135 males and 1065 females. The sex ratio was 938. The literacy rate was 80.23

References 

alagu nachiamman temple was there

Villages in Thanjavur district